Granulifusus kurodai is a species of sea snail, a marine gastropod mollusk in the family Fasciolariidae, the spindle snails, the tulip snails and their allies. This marine species occurs off Japan.

This species reproduces sexually.

References

External links
 Kantor Y.I., Fedosov A.E., Snyder M.A. & Bouchet P. (2018). Pseudolatirus Bellardi, 1884 revisited, with the description of two new genera and five new species (Neogastropoda: Fasciolariidae). European Journal of Taxonomy. 433: 1-57

kurodai
Gastropods described in 1964